The Duro Car Company was an automobile manufacturer from 1907 to 1911. The factory was located on Los Angeles street between Ninth street and Tenth street in Los Angeles, California. They produced steam-powered Durocar automobiles.

References

Bibliography 

Durocar
1910s cars
Vintage vehicles